James, Jim, or Jimmy Kemp may refer to:

Religion
 James Kemp (bishop) (1764–1827), Episcopal bishop in America
 James Kemp (missionary) (1797–1872), missionary for the Church of England
 James W. Kemp (1950s–2006), Methodist minister and author

Sports
 James William Young Kemp, better known as Hamish Kemp, Scottish rugby player
 Jimmy Kemp (born 1971), former CFL quarterback
 Jimmy Kemp (cricketer) (1918–1994), New Zealand cricketer
 Jim Kemp (Australian rules footballer) (born 1947), Australian footballer
 Gabby Kemp (James Albert Kemp, 1919–1993), American baseball player

Others
 James Kemp (Australian politician) (1833–1873), member of the New South Wales Parliament
 James Furman Kemp (1859–1926), American geologist
 James Kemp (NAACP) (1912–1983), American labor organizer and president of the NAACP

See also
 James Kempt (1764–1854), British Army officer of the Napoleonic era